"Everything You Want" is a song performed by American singer Ray J, serving as both title track and second single from his debut Everything You Want (1997). The song peaked at #33 in New Zealand and #83 on the Billboard Hot 100.

Personnel
All instruments played by Keith Crouch except where noted.

 Guitar - John “Jubu” Smith
 Trumpet - Johnny Britt
 Handclaps - Michael Williams, Keith Crouch, Roy “Dog” Pennon, Nora Payne, John “Jubu” Smith 
 Saxophone - Derrick Edmondson
 Background Vocals - Kenny Lattimore, Ray J 
 Vocal Arrangement - Keith Crouch

Track listing
Everything You Want (album version)
Everything You Want (instrumental)

Notes

Ray J songs
Music videos directed by Francis Lawrence
1997 songs
Atlantic Records singles
1997 singles
Songs written by Keith Crouch
Songs written by Willie Norwood